Nane or NANE may refer to:

Places 
 Nane, Bulgaria
 Nane, Mawal, Pune district, Maharashtra, India
 Nane District, Luang Prabang Province, Laos

Other uses 
 Nane (goddess), an Armenian mother goddess
 Daniela Nane (born 1971), Romanian actress and director
 Joseph Nane (born 1987), Cameroonian footballer
 Nane Germon (1909–2001), French actress
 National Association for Nursery Education